Clinostigma harlandii is a species of flowering plant in the family Arecaceae. It is found only in Vanuatu. It is threatened by habitat loss.

References

harlandii
Endemic flora of Vanuatu
Trees of Vanuatu
Near threatened plants
Taxa named by Odoardo Beccari
Taxonomy articles created by Polbot